FK Borac (Serbian Cyrillic: ФК Бopaц Ocтpужницa) is a football club based in Ostružnica, Serbia.

History
FK Borac was founded in 1931.

FK Borac participated in the qualifications for the 2010–11 Serbian Cup.

References

External links
 Club page at FudbalskaZona

Football clubs in Serbia
Association football clubs established in 1931
1931 establishments in Serbia